The Thirteenth Federal Electoral District of the Federal District (XIII Distrito Electoral Federal del Distrito Federal) is one of the 300 Electoral Districts into which Mexico is divided for the purpose of elections to the federal Chamber of Deputies and one of 27 such districts in the Federal District ("DF" or Mexico City).

It elects one deputy to the lower house of Congress for each three-year legislative period, by means of the first past the post system.

District territory
Under the 2005 districting scheme, the DF's Thirteenth  District covers the whole of the borough (delegación) of Iztacalco, with the exception of its easternmost sector, which belongs to the 11th District.

Previous districting schemes

1996–2005 district
Between 1996 and 2005, the Thirteenth District covered the central and eastern portions of Iztacalco.

Deputies returned to Congress from this district

XLIX Legislature
 1973–1976: Javier Blanco Sánchez (PAN)
L Legislature
 1976–1979: Rodolfo González Guevara (PRI)
LI Legislature
 1979–1982: Joel Ayala (PRI)
LII Legislature
 1982–1985: Hilda Anderson Nevárez (PRI)
LIII Legislature
 1985–1988:
LIV Legislature
 1988–1991:
LV Legislature
 1991–1994:
LVI Legislature
 1994–1997: Fernando Salgado Delgado (PRI)
LVII Legislature
 1997–2000: Bruno Espejel Basaldúa (PRD)
LVIII Legislature
 2000–2003: Máximo Soto Gómez (PAN)
LIX Legislature
 2003–2006: Emilio Serrano Jiménez (PRD)
LX Legislature
 2006–2009: Pablo Trejo Pérez (PRD)

References and notes

Federal electoral districts of Mexico
Mexico City